
The McCulloch Aircraft Corporation was the aircraft division of the McCulloch Motors Corporation. McCulloch acquired Helicopter Engineering Research Corp in 1951. It manufactured two innovative helicopter designs – the tandem-rotor MC-4 and the J-2 autogyro.

Rights to the twin-rotor MC-4 was sold back to the original designer, Drago Jovanovich, in 1957.  Rights to the J-2 autogyro were sold to Aero Resources (Gardena, California) in 1974.

References 
 
 https://web.archive.org/web/20090108062245/http://www.shanaberger.com/mcculloch.htm

External links

Defunct aircraft manufacturers of the United States
Defunct helicopter manufacturers of the United States